Mansi Township is a township of Bhamo District in the Kachin State of Burma. The principal town is Mansi.

The forests of Mansi Township are affected by illegal logging.

References

Townships of Kachin State